Achilleas Zafiriou (born 22 July 1970) is a retired Greek football defender.

References

1970 births
Living people
Greek footballers
PAOK FC players
Iraklis Thessaloniki F.C. players
Association football defenders
Super League Greece players